From the Bitter to the Sweet is the latest release by Canadian singer Luba.  A primarily solo work on her own label and her first in more than a decade, it did not produce as many sales or as much radio airplay as her previous albums.  These songs are much more subdued than in earlier works, possibly due to her recent hard times. However, the album still won some critical acclaim.  Featured singles include "Sorry," "Is She a Lot Like Me" and "Let Me Be the One."

Track listing
Sorry – 5:05
Is She a Lot Like Me – 4:26
Let Me Be the One – 4:50
All Over Again – 4:51
Sooner Than Soon - 4:40
How Can I Trust You Now - 4:53
Inside Out - 4:22
From the Bitter to the Sweet - 4:41
I Am What I Am - 3:59
What Would It Take - 5:45
Anything At All - 2:39

Personnel
 Luba: vocals, acoustic guitar
 Rick Haworth: electric guitar, octave mandolin
 Norman DiBlasio: piano, keyboards, drum programming
 Kevin DeSouza: bass
 Eric Lange: drums, percussion
 Don Meunier: classical and acoustic guitar
 Ligia Paquin: viola
 François Pilon: violin
 Sheila Hannigan: cello

Additional musicians
 Andrew Creegan: percussion, dulcimer on "Let Me Be the One"
 Pat Sheehan: acoustic and electric Guitars on "From the Bitter to the Sweet"
 Borza Ghomeshi: electric guitar on "I Am What I Am"

References
 The Ectophiles' Guide to Good Music. Luba: Credits. Retrieved Apr. 19, 2007.

External links
 Official Luba website
 Luba at canoe.ca
 Luba on MySpace

2000 albums
Luba (singer) albums